Xiping Station is a metro station in Dongguan, China. It opened on 27 May 2016. Since 28 December 2017, it has interchanged with the Dongguan–Huizhou intercity railway at Xiping West railway station.

Station Platform

References

Dongguan Rail Transit stations
Railway stations in China opened in 2016